Hamadani, Hamedani or Hamadhani is an Arabic nisbah (attributive title) that denotes an origin from Hamadan. It is commonly used for Badi' al-Zaman al-Hamadani, but the many notable people with the surname include:

 Mihran-i Hamadani (died 633), Sasanian military officer
 Burayr ibn Khuzayr al-Hamadani (7th century), Qāriʾ, Tabi‘un, and companion of Ali
 Ibn al-Faqih al-Hamadhani (10th century), Persian historian and geographer
 Abd al-Jabbâr al-Hamadhânî (935–1025), Mu'tazilite theologian
 Baba Taher Oryan Hamadani (938–1021), Persian poet
 Badi' al-Zaman al-Hamadani (969–1007), Persian Arabic-language writer and poet
 Yusuf Hamadani (1062–1141), Persian Sufi master
 Ayn al-Quzat Hamadani (1098–1131), Persian judge, mystic, and philosopher
 Rashid-al-Din Hamadani (1247–1318), Persian statesman, historian and physician
 Mir Sayyid Ali Hamadani (1314–1384), Persian Sufi poet and scholar
 Moshfegh Hamadani (1914–2009), Jewish Iranian journalist and writer
 Yosef Hamadani Cohen (1916–2014), Iranian Chief Rabbi
 Hossein Noori Hamedani (born 1926), Iranian Twelver Shi'a Marja
 Hossein Hamadani (1951–2015), Iranian Revolutionary Guard commander 
 Sattar Hamedani (born 1974), Iranian footballer
 Ameer Sabah Hussein Al-Hamadani (born 1988), Iraqi footballer
 Anwar Al-Hamadani, Iraqi television presenter

See also
 Hamadani (disambiguation)
 Hamdani (disambiguation)

Iranian-language surnames
Arabic-language surnames
Hamadani